Pabstiella armeniaca is a species of orchid plant.

References 

armeniaca
Plants described in 1896